The 1960 Democratic National Convention was held in Los Angeles, California, on July 11–15, 1960. It nominated Senator John F. Kennedy of Massachusetts for president and Senate Majority Leader Lyndon B. Johnson of Texas for vice president.

In the general election that November, the Kennedy–Johnson ticket won an electoral college victory and a narrow popular vote plurality (slightly over 110,000 nationally) over the Republican candidates Vice President Richard M. Nixon and UN Ambassador Henry C. Lodge II.

Due to its size, the Biltmore Hotel was selected to serve as the headquarters hotel for the Democratic National Committee. It also housed command-posts for the campaigns of the various candidates seeking the nomination, temporary studio spaces for the television networks, and workspaces for select print journalists.

Prologue

The major candidates for the 1960 Democratic presidential nomination were Kennedy, Governor Pat Brown of California, Senator Stuart Symington of Missouri, Senator Lyndon B. Johnson of Texas, former Illinois Governor Adlai Stevenson, Senator Wayne Morse of Oregon, and Senator Hubert Humphrey of Minnesota. Several other candidates sought support in their home state or region as "favorite son" candidates without any realistic chance of winning the nomination. Symington, Stevenson, and Johnson all declined to campaign in the presidential primaries. While this reduced their potential delegate count going into the Democratic National Convention, each of these three candidates hoped that the other leading contenders would stumble in the primaries, thus causing the convention's delegates to choose him as a "compromise" candidate acceptable to all factions of the party.

Kennedy was initially dogged by suggestions from some Democratic Party elders (such as former President Harry S. Truman, who was supporting Symington) that he was too youthful and inexperienced to be president; these critics suggested that he should agree to be the running mate for another Democrat. Realizing that this was a strategy touted by his opponents to keep the public from taking him seriously, Kennedy stated frankly, "I'm not running for vice-president, I'm running for president."

The next step was the primaries. Kennedy's Roman Catholic religion was an issue. Kennedy first challenged Minnesota Senator Hubert Humphrey in the Wisconsin primary and defeated him. Kennedy's sisters, brothers, and wife Jacqueline combed the state looking for votes, leading Humphrey to complain that he "felt like an independent merchant competing against a chain store." However, some political experts argued that Kennedy's margin of victory had come almost entirely from Catholic areas, and thus Humphrey decided to continue the contest in the heavily Protestant state of West Virginia. The first televised debate of 1960 was held in West Virginia, and Kennedy outperformed Humphrey. Humphrey's campaign was low on funds and could not compete for advertising and other "get-out-the-vote" drives with Kennedy's well-financed and well-organized campaign. In the end, Kennedy defeated Humphrey with over 60% of the vote, and Humphrey ended his presidential campaign. West Virginia showed that Kennedy, a Catholic, could win in a heavily Protestant state. Although Kennedy had only competed in nine presidential primaries, Kennedy's rivals, Johnson and Symington, failed to campaign in any primaries. Even though Stevenson had twice been the Democratic Party's presidential candidate and retained a loyal following of liberals,  especially in California, his two landslide defeats to Republican Dwight Eisenhower led most party leaders and delegates to search for a "fresh face" who could win a national election. Following the primaries, Kennedy traveled around the nation speaking to state delegations and their leaders. As the Democratic Convention opened, Kennedy was far in the lead, but was still seen as being just short of the delegate total he needed to win.

In the week before the convention opened, Kennedy received two new challengers when Lyndon B. Johnson, the powerful Senate Majority Leader from Texas, and Adlai Stevenson II, the party's nominee in 1952 and 1956, announced their candidacies. Johnson challenged Kennedy to a televised debate before a joint meeting of the Texas and Massachusetts delegations; Kennedy accepted. Most observers felt that Kennedy won the debate, and Johnson was not able to expand his delegate support beyond the South.

Two Johnson supporters, including John B. Connally, brought up the question of Kennedy's health. Connally said that Kennedy had Addison's disease. JFK press secretary Pierre Salinger of California denied the story. A Kennedy physician, Janet Travell, released a statement that the senator's adrenal glands were functioning adequately and that he was no more susceptible to infection than anyone else. It was also denied that Kennedy was on cortisone.

Platform
The Democratic platform in 1960 was the longest yet. They called for a loosening of tight economic policy: "We Democrats believe that the economy can and must grow at an average rate of 5 percent annually, almost twice as fast as our annual rate since 1953...As the first step in speeding economic growth, a Democratic president will put an end to the present high-interest-rate, tight-money policy." Other planks included national defense, disarmament, civil rights, immigration, foreign aid, the economy, labor and tax reform. Senator Sam Ervin of North Carolina attempted to soften the party's plank on civil rights. A speech by Hawaii delegate Patsy Mink persuaded two-thirds of the party to keep their progressive stance on the issue.

Presidential nomination

On July 13, 1960, the third day of the convention, Kennedy gained a narrow majority on the first ballot, with campaign manager Robert F. Kennedy securing critical delegates at the last minute. The final tally was:

Kennedy was the first senator since 1920 to be nominated for the presidency by either the Democrats or the Republicans. On the last day of the convention, Kennedy delivered his acceptance speech from the adjacent Los Angeles Memorial Coliseum. In the speech he spoke about how Americans may be hesitant about him because of his faith. In his speech he said, "I am fully aware of the fact that the Democratic party, by nominating someone of my faith, has taken on what many regard as a new and hazardous risk." He went on to break down the hesitance some may have about his Catholic faith, "And you have, at the same time, placed your confidence in me, and my ability to render a free, fair, judgment...and to reject any kind of religious pressure or obligation that might directly or indirectly interfere with my conduct of the Presidency in the national interest."

Kennedy's acceptance speech also outlined his vision of  "a New Frontier" which he contrasted with Franklin D. Roosevelt's New Deal, being "a set of challenges" rather than "a set of promises". He stated the idea summed up "not what I intend to offer the American people, but what I intend to ask of them."

Theodore H. White wrote in The Making of the President 1960 that in Washington DC Richard Nixon decided to watch Kennedy making his speech with two members of his own campaign. Nixon concluded that Kennedy's performance was poor and that he could defeat him in proposed televised debates.

Vice Presidential nomination

After Kennedy secured the Democratic nomination, he asked Johnson to be his running mate, a move that surprised many, and for several decades, there was much debate about why it was offered to Johnson and why he had accepted. Some speculated that it was a courtesy move for Johnson, who was the Senate Majority Leader, and that Kennedy was surprised when Johnson accepted; Kennedy had preferred Stuart Symington of Missouri or Henry "Scoop" Jackson of Washington as his running mate.

A related story is that after Johnson accepted the offer, Robert Kennedy went to Johnson's hotel suite to dissuade Johnson from becoming the vice-presidential nominee. Johnson was offended that "JFK's kid brother" would brashly urge him to stay off the ticket. In response to his blunt confrontation with Robert Kennedy, Johnson called JFK to confirm that the vice-presidential nomination was his, which JFK confirmed. Milton DeWitt Brinson, a North Carolina delegate, asked Senator Sam Ervin to get down on his knees and beg Johnson if need be to convince him to take the nomination. The record shows that the North Carolina delegation was instrumental in his decision to run. Johnson and Robert Kennedy became so embittered and the episode marked the beginning of the personal and political feud that would have grave implications for the Democratic Party in the 1960s.

In 1993, Evelyn Lincoln, JFK's personal secretary (both before and during his presidency), described how the decision was made in a videotaped interview. She said she was the only witness to a private meeting between John and Robert Kennedy in a suite at the Biltmore Hotel where they made the decision. She said she went in and out of the room as they spoke and, when she was in the room, she heard them say that Johnson had tried to blackmail JFK into offering him the vice presidential nomination with evidence of his womanizing provided by FBI director J. Edgar Hoover, discuss possible ways to avoid making the offer, and conclude JFK had no choice. This portion of the videotape of Lincoln's interview was included in The History Channel's documentary series The Men Who Killed Kennedy, in concluding Episode 9, "The Guilty Men", produced and aired in 2003.

Kennedy announced Johnson as his choice of running-mate on the afternoon of July 14. Johnson was nominated by acclamation that evening. The Chicago Tribune reported that there were shouts of protest from the galleries against the motion to suspend the rules to nominate Johnson, and again when he was acclaimed. Johnson is recorded as receiving 100% of the vote.

In culture
The convention was the setting for Norman Mailer's famous profile of Kennedy, "Superman Comes to the Supermarket", published in Esquire.

See also
 1960 Republican National Convention
 1960 United States presidential election
 History of the United States Democratic Party
 List of Democratic National Conventions
 United States presidential nominating convention
 John F. Kennedy 1960 presidential campaign
 1960 Democratic Party presidential primaries

References

External links
Full table of 1960 Presidential primary results, John F. Kennedy Presidential Library
 Democratic Party Platform of 1960 at The American Presidency Project
 Kennedy Nomination Acceptance Speech for President at DNC (transcript) at The American Presidency Project

Multimedia
Kennedy Acceptance Speech and Analysis, C-SPAN, August 23, 2008.
Video highlights of the convention: Part 1: Monday & Tuesday and Part 2: Wednesday – Friday, hosted on YouTube.
 Video of Kennedy nomination acceptance speech for President at DNC (via YouTube)
 Audio of Kennedy nomination acceptance speech for President at DNC
 Video of Johnson nomination acceptance speech for Vice President at DNC (via YouTube)

1960 United States presidential election
Democrat
Democrat
Conventions in Los Angeles
Political conventions in California
California Democratic Party
Democratic National Conventions
1960 conferences
July 1960 events in the United States
Adlai Stevenson II